Hollow point is a type of expanding bullet.

Hollow Point may also refer to:

Films
 Hollow Point (1996 film) FBI and DEA team up with hitman to foil mob boss
 Hollow Point (2019 film) a  man finds himself caught up in a war between vigilantes and criminals
The Hollow Point, a 2016 American Western film

Fictional characters
 Hollow Point (G.I. Joe), a G.I. Joe character